Ballard is a rural locality in the Lockyer Valley Region, Queensland, Australia.

Geography

History
The locality, historically known as Ballaroo, is named for Robert Ballard, a railway engineer for Peto, Brassey and Betts who oversaw the construction of the main range section of the Ipswich–Toowoomba railway.

In December 1885, "The Highfields Estate" made up of 147 allotments was advertised for sale by Arthur Martin & Co. Despite the use of the Highfields name, the estate is not within present day Highfields but is predominantly within present day Ballard with small areas in Blue Mountain Heights and Murphys Creek. A map advertising the land sale illustrates the location of the estate in proximity to the "S & W Railway line" and the Highfields railway station (now known as Spring Bluff railway station) and shows town allotments in the area of the intersection of Valley View Road and Hanleys Road. The map describes the estate as the "Sanatorium and Garden of Queensland".

Heritage listings

Ballard has a number of heritage-listed sites, including:
  north of Toowoomba: Swansons Rail Bridge

References

External links 

Lockyer Valley Region
Localities in Queensland